"Brain Stew" and "Jaded" are two songs released as a joint single by American rock band Green Day. They appear as the tenth and eleventh tracks and third single from the group's fourth studio album, Insomniac. The song was also included on Godzilla: The Album. The two songs were released as one single, as the songs are transitional – "Brain Stew" segues directly into "Jaded". After 9/11, "Brain Stew" was placed on Clear Channel's list of post-9/11 inappropriate titles. The song "Brain Stew" is about Armstrong dealing with insomnia. According to Armstrong himself, "Brain Stew" was originally called "Insomniac" on demo (hence the title of the album on which it is featured), and "Brain Stew" is a reference to Armstrong's long-time friend, James Washburn, who is nicknamed Brain Stew.

There is also a limited edition CD single of the two songs in which the disc is in the shape of a brain.

Both "Brain Stew" and "Jaded" were included in the band's first greatest hits album International Superhits!. However, only "Brain Stew" was included in the band's second greatest hit album God's Favorite Band and is the only song off of Insomniac to be included.

Track listing

Vinyl box set

Other versions
"Brain Stew"
 A live version featured on Bowling Bowling Bowling Parking Parking recorded March 26, 1996 at Sporthalle, Prague, Czech Republic. Later featured on the Vinyl Box Set version of the "Brain Stew / Jaded" single. 
 Another live version on Bullet in a Bible.
 A remix was made for the soundtrack of the 1998 movie Godzilla.
  Rivers Cuomo did a cover of the song on Sessions @AOL in 2009. The performance was recorded for his band, Weezer's EP called Happy Record Store Day 
 A cover was made by the band The Upside Downs named Brain Stew 10. The band was made by Ray William Johnson.

"Jaded"
 A live version found on Bowling Bowling Bowling Parking Parking. (recorded March 26, 1996 at Sporthalle, Prague, Czech Republic)
 A live version was performed during the Milton Keynes concert recorded for "Bullet in a Bible" but was omitted from the CD/DVD

"Good Riddance (Time of Your Life)"
 This single features a demo version of the Nimrod track "Good Riddance (Time of Your Life)". This demo is played in G♭ rather than G Standard.

Live performances
The "Brain Stew" part of the song has been played at almost every single one of Green Day's concerts since its release. There have been several notable performances of this song. For instance, the band played the song in front of 130,000 people at the Milton Keynes National Bowl for the live DVD–CD Bullet in a Bible. Another notable performance was when the group performed it at Goat Island in Sydney, Australia on October 19, 2000, where Armstrong mixed up the verses by accident. During the 21st Century Breakdown World Tour, the band played this after playing numerous cover rock songs.

Music video
The music video for "Brain Stew/Jaded" consists of two parts: The "Brain Stew" portion of the video is sepia toned and depicts the band lying on a couch being pulled through a landfill by a bulldozer, interspersed with shots of Hula dancers, mealworms, a dog, and a teacher writing on a chalkboard. When the song transitions to "Jaded", the video transitions to chrome and shows fast shots of the band playing the song in their recording studio with more shots of mealworms and hula dancers. The video was directed by Kevin Kerslake.

Chart positions

See also
List of RPM Rock/Alternative number-one singles (Canada)

References

External links
 

1996 singles
Green Day songs
Song recordings produced by Rob Cavallo
Songs written by Billie Joe Armstrong
Music medleys
Music videos directed by Kevin Kerslake
1995 songs
Songs written by Tré Cool
Songs written by Mike Dirnt
Reprise Records singles
Grunge songs
Hardcore punk songs